The 1960 Arkansas gubernatorial election was held on November 8, 1960.

Incumbent Democratic Governor Orval Faubus won election to a fourth term, defeating Republican nominee Henry M. Britt with 69.21% of the vote.

That year, Faubus simultaneously ran for President under the white supremacist National States' Rights Party.

Primary elections
Primary elections were held on July 26, 1960. By winning over 50% of the vote, Faubus avoided a run-off which would have been held on August 9, 1960.

Democratic primary

Candidates
Bruce Bennett, incumbent Attorney General of Arkansas
Orval Faubus, incumbent Governor
Joe C. Hardin, businessman, Farm Bureau President, and former natural gas company executive
Hal Millsap, supermarket owner
Rev. H. E. Williams, president of Southern Baptist College, Walnut Ridge

Results

Republican primary

Candidates
Henry M. Britt, attorney

Results

General election

Candidates
Orval Faubus, Democratic
Henry M. Britt, Republican

Results

References

Bibliography
 

1960
Arkansas
Gubernatorial
November 1960 events in the United States